August Friedrich Wilhelm von Borries (27 January 1852 in Bad Oeynhausen – 14 February 1906) was one of Germany's most influential railway engineers, who was primarily concerned with developments in steam locomotives.

Von Borries graduated from the Royal Institute of Trade in Charlottenburg, and then spent a year working at the Bergisch-Märkische railway. In 1875, he joined the service of the Hanover division of the Prussian state railways and subsequently became their Chief Mechanical Engineer. In 1880 he designed the first Prussian compound locomotive, built by Schichau in Elbląg. This showed significant fuel savings.  His work on compound locomotives was done in collaboration with the British engineer Thomas William Worsdell and the two men obtained several British patents together. The 1880 locomotive was a two-cylinder compound but, in 1899, he designed a four-cylinder compound locomotive.  Another innovation was the use of nickel steel for boilers in 1891.

In 1902 he left the Prussian state railways and took a professorship of Railway Engineering at the Technical University of Charlottenburg.

He wrote widely on locomotive matters, including a textbook on locomotives.

See also 
 List of railway pioneers

References

Sources
Die Eisenbahn-Betriebsmittel. Theil 1. Die Lokomotiven, bearb. von: August F. W. von Borries. Kreidel, Wiesbaden 1897 (Die Eisenbahn-Technik der Gegenwart, Band 1). Nachdruck: Bufe, München 1982
Biografie: Götz von Borries: Die Geschwister von Borries. Fouqué Literaturverlag, Egelsbach/Frankfurt 1998, 
 Marshall, John, A Biographical Dictionary of Railway Engineers, David and Charles 1978, pp 226–227, 

1852 births
1906 deaths
19th-century German inventors
German railway mechanical engineers
Locomotive builders and designers
People from Bad Oeynhausen
Engineers from North Rhine-Westphalia
Academic staff of the Technical University of Berlin